Thomas Tryon (6 September 1634 – 21 August 1703) was an English sugar merchant, author of popular self-help books, and early advocate of animal rights and vegetarianism.

Life
Born in 1634 in Bibury near Cirencester, Gloucestershire, England, he had to work spinning wool as a child and received no education. As a teenager, he worked as a shepherd till the age of eighteen and managed to learn reading and writing in his spare time. In 1652 he moved to London without telling his parents and apprenticed with a hatter at the Bridewell area. He became an Anabaptist in 1654 under the influence of his master. He liked the ascetic lifestyle of that congregation, but soon he found his own independent spiritual way after reading the writings of Jakob Böhme. In 1657 he heard an inner voice, which he named the "Voice of Wisdom", encouraging him to become a vegetarian and to live on a frugal diet. He married in 1661 but failed to convert his wife to his lifestyle.

He traveled to Barbados hoping to succeed in his hat trade and to profit from greater religious tolerance there, but was shocked by the cruelty of slavery in the plantations. In 1669 he returned to London and settled in Hackney. In 1682 his inner voice told him to engage in writing and to publish books in order to propagate temperance and nonviolence. In the last two decades of his life, he published twenty-seven works on a wide range of subjects, including education, nutrition, abstinence from alcohol and tobacco and other health issues, and treatment of slaves. At the same time he continued his hat trade and grew wealthy. Some of his self-help books sold very well.

Influence 
His most widely read book was The Way to Health, published in 1691 as a second edition of Health's Grand Preservative; or, The Women's Best Doctor (1682). It inspired Benjamin Franklin to adopt vegetarianism. Tryon's writings also impressed playwright Aphra Behn (whose "On the Author of that Excellent Book Intitled The way to HEALTH, LONG LIFE, and HAPPINESS," appears in Tryon's 1697 Way to Health"), and vegetarian poet Percy Bysshe Shelley. Tryon died in Hackney in August 1703 and his memoirs, Some Memoirs of the Life of Mr. Thomas Tryon, Late of London, Merchant, were published posthumously in 1705.

Ideas
Tryon's ideas on historical and philosophical matters were heavily influenced by ancient Pythagoreanism, Hinduism, and the teachings of German occultist Heinrich Cornelius Agrippa. He considered himself a Christian and tried to reconcile Biblical, Pythagorean and Hindu teachings. His conviction was that there was one true original religion of mankind, followed by Moses, Pythagoras and the Indian Brahmins, but perverted by the majority of Christians. According to him, the main tenets of that faith were pacifism and nonviolence to animals; benevolence to all species and vegetarianism were prerequisites for spiritual progress and a possible restoration of Paradise. He explicitly advocated animal rights.

Tryon was of the opinion that humans are a miniature image of the universe (microcosm). He voiced environmental concerns about the pollution of rivers and the destruction of forests. Tryon did not believe in reincarnation, but assumed that the souls of sinners take on the forms of vicious beasts in a nightmarish afterlife.

Tryon has been associated with the history of animal rights. Historians have described Tryon as the first known author to use the word "rights" in regard to animals in his book The Way to Health, Long Life and Happiness, published in 1683. He commented that man "would fain be an absolute Monarch or arbitrary Tyrant, making nothing at his pleasure to break the Laws of God, and invade and destroy all the Rights and Priviledges of the inferiour Creatures."

Selected publications
The Way to Health, Long Life and Happiness (1683)
Wisdom's Dictates, or, Aphorisms & Rules, Physical, Moral, and Divine, for Preserving the Health of the Body, and the Peace of the Mind (1691)
A Treatise of Cleanness in Meats and Drinks, of the Preparation of Food, the Excellency of Good Airs, and the Benefits of Clean Sweet Beds (1682)
The Knowledge of a Man's Self the Surest Guide to the True Worship of God, and Good Government of the Mind and Body (1703)

See also
Benjamin Lay, an early abolitionist who was influenced by Tryon
List of abolitionist forerunners

References

Further reading
 O'Connell, Anne: Early Vegetarian Recipes, Prospect Books 2008. . Includes recipes taken from Tryon's 'Wisdom's Dictates' 1691
 
 
 Sheridan, Richard B. Sugar and Slavery: An Economic History of the British West Indies, 1623–1775. Kingston: University of the West Indies, 2008. . Provides facts concerning Tryon's association with the sugar trade and Barbados.
 Tryon, T. Tryon's letters upon several occasions ... London: printed for Geo. Conyers and Eliz. Harris, 1700.
 Tryon, T. The merchant, citizen and country-man's instructor. London: printed for E. Harris, and G. Conyers, 1701.

External links

 Quotes by Thomas Tryon

1634 births
1703 deaths
17th-century English male writers
17th-century English merchants
18th-century English male writers
18th-century English non-fiction writers
British vegetarianism activists
English animal rights scholars
English Anabaptists
English food writers
English pacifists
English self-help writers
English temperance activists
British milliners
History of sugar
People from Bibury